Brambledown Halt is a disused railway station between Minster and Eastchurch. It opened in 1905 and closed in 1950.

References

External links
 Brambledown Halt station on navigable 1940 O. S. map
 Picture of Brambledown Halt station

Disused railway stations in Kent
Former Sheppey Light Railway stations
Railway stations in Great Britain opened in 1905
Railway stations in Great Britain closed in 1950
1905 establishments in England
1950 disestablishments in England